Alca is a genus of charadriiform bird that contains a single extant species, the razorbill (Alca torda). Many fossil species are known, the oldest dating back to the Miocene. The genus appears to have always been restricted to the North Atlantic.

References

Bird genera
Bird genera with one living species
Alcidae
Auks